Tapan Dasgupta is an Indian politician who served as minister of Agriculture Marketing in West Bengal under the ministry of Mamata Banerjee from 2016 till 2021. Being as member of Trinamool Congress, he is currently serving as member of West Bengal Legislative Assembly from Saptagram constituency since 2011.

Early life and education 
Dasgupta was graduate student of Rishi Bankim College, Naihati. He completed his studies and did B.A. in Calcutta University in 1975.

Controversies 
Mamata Banerjee, the Chief Minister of West Bengal, took action in July 2019 to remove minister Dasgupta from his position as party president of the Hooghly district unit. This came just a few days after his name was mentioned in connection with the kickback scandal. Dilip Yadav, a local leader, has taken over for Dasgupta in this role.

References 

Year of birth missing (living people)
Living people
West Bengal politicians